John Kinsella may refer to:

 John Kinsella (composer) (1932–2021), Irish composer
 John Kinsella (criminal) (died 2018, age 53), English criminal
 John Kinsella (hurler) (born 1947), Irish sportsperson
 John Kinsella (poet) (born 1963), Australian poet, novelist, critic, essayist and editor
 John Kinsella (swimmer) (born 1952), American Olympic swimmer

See also
 John Kinsela (1950–2020), Australian wrestler